Selimiye may refer to:

 Selimiye Mosque (disambiguation), the name of various mosques.
 Selimiye Barracks, in Istanbul, Turkey
 Selimiye (Antalya), a village in Antalya Province, near Manavgat and Side, Turkey
 Selimiye (Marmaris), a village in Muğla Province, on the Bozburun peninsula, Turkey
 Selimiye (Milas), a village in Muğla Province, near Milas, Turkey
 Selimiye Tunnel, a road tunnel between Hopa and Kemalpaşa in Artvin Province, Turkey